In India, security details are provided to some high-risk individuals by the police and local government. Depending on the threat perception to the person, the category is divided into six tiers: SPG, Z+ (highest level), Z, Y+, Y and X. Individuals under this security blanket include (but are not limited to) the President, Vice President, Prime Minister, Supreme Court and High Court Judges, Service Chiefs of Indian Armed, Governors of State, Chief Ministers and Cabinet Ministers, actors and other VIPs.

 SPG is an elite force whose details are classified and only provided to the Prime Minister of India.
 Z+ category is a security detail of 55 personnel, including 10+ NSG commandos and police personnel.
 Z category is a security detail of 22 personnel, including 4-6 NSG commandos and police personnel.
Y+ category is a security detail of 11 personnel, including 2-4 commandos and police personnel.
 Y category is a security detail of 8 personnel, including 1 or 2 commandos and police personnel.
 X category is a security detail of 2 personnel, with no commandos but only armed police personnel.

The Z+ level of security is provided by National Security Guard commandos. They are armed with Heckler & Koch MP5 sub-machine guns and modern communication equipment, and each member of the team is adept in martial arts and unarmed combat skills. Currently 40 VIPs are provided with such protection.  The Z category entails protection by the Delhi Police or the ITBP or CRPF personnel and one escort car. The Y category encompasses two personal security officers (PSOs) and the X category, one PSO.

In practice, the number of police personnel deployed for VIP security often far exceeds the officially allocated number. For example, over 200 civil police (not counting armed police, counted as a separate category, or any privately hired security) were posted at Mulayam Singh Yadav's Lucknow residence during his third term as Chief Minister of Uttar Pradesh. His successor, Mayawati, reportedly had over 350 police officers in her security detail.

The "Blue Book" details about security given to the President , Vice-President and the Prime Minister and their families and the "Yellow Book" details about security given to other VIPs and VVIPs. The Home Ministry in coordination with different intelligence agencies issues guidelines for security cover.

The SPG (Special Protection Group), NSG (National Security Guards), ITBP (Indo-Tibetan Border Police) and CRPF (Central Reserve Police Force) CISF (Central Industrial Security Force)  are the agencies responsible for providing securities to VVIPs, VIPs, politicians, high-profile celebrities and sportspersons. The NSG is used extensively to guard VIPs and VVIPs, especially those in the Z+ category. Many NSG personnel are seconded to the Special Protection Group (SPG) which guards the Prime Minister. Most NSG and SPG commandos have already served in para military forces or special forces.

Categories

Security of the President 
Security to the President of India is ensured by The President's Bodyguard (PBG). PBG is not only the most senior unit of the Indian Armed Forces but also the oldest. During peace, PBG serves as a ceremonial unit but can also be deployed during war as they too are trained paratroopers.

Failures
Former Prime Minister Indira Gandhi was assassinated by members of her own security detail. Rajbir Singh, a famous encounter specialist was killed in March 2008 despite a Z-level security detail. While under protection from the security detail, former Union Minister Pramod Mahajan was shot dead by his brother.

Controversy 
This is criticized often by media as a waste of taxpayer's money.
  Former Home Minister P. Chidambaram phased out the use of the NSG for VIP protection in all but the most serious cases. Nevertheless, controversies arose as many politicians remained under a Z+ category while many bureaucrats were moved down to Y.

The excessive use of VIP security results in some police stations being effectively understaffed, since their officers are being diverted from serving the general public. Some police stations routinely operate at less than 50% capacity; one rural station near Lucknow was noted in 2013 to have just 1-5 officers (out of 35 total) available at any given time to serve a precinct with over 100,000 people over an area of more than 100 square kilometers.

In 2014 as a part of Z security, 25 personnel of the Central Reserve Police Force and the Punjab Police were put in attendance for the security of Ashutosh Maharaj, a spiritual leader who has been declared clinically dead by doctors.

References

Law enforcement in India
Security guards